Surniculus  is a small genus  of birds in the cuckoo family. Its four members are found in tropical Asia and the Philippines. They are:

References
Grimmett, Inskipp and Inskipp, Birds of India 

 
Cuculidae
Bird genera
 
Taxa named by René Lesson